Bothus podas, also known as the wide-eyed flounder, is a flounder in the genus Bothus, native to the Mediterranean Sea and the Atlantic Coast of Africa.

During the reproductive season, males court and mate successively with females in their territories, and females seem to show mating fidelity to their dominant male. Data also show that courtship plays an important role in determining male success in mating.

References

External links
 

Bothidae
Fish described in 1809
Taxa named by François-Étienne de La Roche